Roy Kline (8 June 1915 – 11 May 2009) was an  Australian rules footballer who played with St Kilda in the Victorian Football League (VFL).

Notes

External links 

1915 births
2009 deaths
Australian rules footballers from Victoria (Australia)
St Kilda Football Club players